Maurice George Jesser Ponsonby , M.C. (10 September 1880 - 27 February 1943) was  Dean of Johannesburg from 1923 until 1930.

He was born at Horsley, Gloucestershire; educated at Eton and Trinity College, Oxford; and ordained in 1905. After curacies at Hackney Wick and Benenden he was Rector of Pilgrim's Rest from 1912 to 1914. He was Domestic Chaplain to the Archbishop of York from 1914 to 1919; and also a Chaplain to the Forces during the same period. He was Rector of St Mary's Pro-Cathedral, Johannesburg from 1919 to 1923.

After his return from South Africa he was Rector of Much Haddam from 1930 until 1930. His funeral was held at Newtimber on 3 March 1943.

Notes

External links
 

People educated at Eton College
Alumni of Worcester College, Oxford
Deans of Johannesburg
1880 births
1943 deaths
Recipients of the Military Cross
World War I chaplains